Moala is a volcanic island in the Moala subgroup of Fiji's Lau archipelago. The population of around 3000 live in eight villages. The chief village of Naroi, whose population is over 500, was formalised during the colonial era to entertain those that would not be entertained elsewhere. Economic activities include coconut farming, cocoa production, fishing and yaqona (kava) production.

Oral history of the Island depicted by the genealogical records which is funded by the British through Ratu Sukuna, whose mother is from Naocovonu, a clan within the larger Nasau group. The genealogical records or Vola-ni-Kawa Bula kei Viti abbreviated as VKB, dictates that all Moalans are to be registered under two great sons of pre-Colonial Fiji, and these are: Kubuavanua (now claimant to the title Tui Moala) and Rovarovaivalu. This separates the Island into two sub-regions: Moala Levu (as the claimant want to call themselves) and Moala Lailai. Moala Levu includes the clan that called themselves Nasau a.k.a Yavusa Ratu, Turagalevu or Turaga Ulu, whose influence is mainly felt on the West-north-west of the island from Naroi to Vadra. Moala Lailai, whose village include: Keteria (formerly Uciwai) Vunuku, Nasoki and Cakova, with keenly influence from Wainikelei (post-Colonially referred to as Keteira), the first inhabitants of the island via Totoya. These group of Moalans are on the East-south-eastern end of the Island from Vunuku, Keteira, Cakova and to Nasoki.

Post-Colonial Fiji resulted in the relocation of Nasau to Naroi today and the resettlement of Manukui to Vunuku, Cakova and Nasoki. Nasoki was the branch off of the Manukui Clan after the Manukui war tat saw the people of Nasoki or the Dau ki Manukui, left stranded on the beach collecting food for the clan after they burned their village to set up a stronghold at the old Wainikelei Fort up n the hills of Nasoli and Keteira today. Other settlers came in the form of Vadra, Nuku and Maloku from other parts of Fiji as a formalization of their effort in the last tribal war that occurred on the Island, that politicised the establishment through the effort to registration Fijians by Sukuna (Rt). The Nasau and Turagalevu clan are said to be progeny of the Wainikelei Clan, who was sent to represent to eldest of the Ratu in an effort to select his successor in an olympic fashioned competition along the Waisiliva and Nukukatudrau in former Verata territory.

Developmental pressure result in undue activity on the islands fragile natural resource forcing the islanders to withdraw excessively. Pollution at sea in an increasing concern, especially in the Uciwai Bay having a narrow channel that restrict the expulsion of pollutants once deposited inside the bay due largely to micro wind and current pattern within the channel.

Religion is a strong component of live with majority following the Methodist Church dogmas. Other Christian denominations; Seventh Day Adventist, Catholics, Assembly of God, and even new prosperity churches and Jehovah'
s Witnesses which are a Christian sect. History of the Methodist church came by way of Maáfu and his Lakeba confederacy with support from the then Wesleyan Missionaries from Australia. The first church was constructed on supposed Nasau land, now Vunuku, which was burned by the Nasau clan after a misgiving with the then clergymen, of Tongan descent. This resulted resulted in the burning of the said dwelling of the priest. Prior to the burning, at the behest of friends, Josaia Donumaibulu the second generation of Moalan stock to follow what was called "lotu" exited the protection of his own brothers of Nasau to settle with his relative and kin in Wainikelei. Donumaibulu served his last mission in Rewa where he died and was commemorated and named after the church (building) at Lomanikoro in Rewa.

Local folk stories, well known to all, despised by many, depict that "Rokomautu" (the sturdy one), however, remained on the island upon arrival on the Kaunitoni (dipping stick), on a maiden voyage° approved by his father, the "Ratu". In other folk stories, the Ratu left Totoya, and made his way to now known Verata, which upon his deathbed render the race on the "nukukatudrau" (hundred fathomed beach) of all his eldest sons' to appoint his successor. This resulted in treachery that shook the Fijian historical narrative and culture to its core. Other popular, now, legends have it that Kubunavanua came to Moala from Tonga, upon returning on the Kaunitera. Kaunitera is his way of taking over the Kaunitoni, by way of changing its name and made his voyage to Tonga. Thus the name, "Kubuavanua" or "Kabuavanua" (shadows of land). Note, legends have it that his return was not acceptable to his clan at Moala as he eloped the high princess ("tabusiga") of Tonga, this supposedly ensured a rescue party from Tonga which seemingly in the face of Maafu. Kubuavanua led the group that calls themselves the "Turagalevu" or "Big King". Folk history would have these two, Rokomautu and Kubuavanua, to be of the first landers or land people, with Rokomautu of the Tuiwai stock and Kuduavanua the Tura stock or the progeny of Degei and Lutunasosba respectively. Local legends has it that the Tuiwai Stock are akin to sailing whose natural skill in navigation is immediately experienced when at the helm. Legend has it that the two stock both arrived at Moala, the Tuiwai stock stayed behind while the Tura stock took helm to Tonga, taking with them the Kaunitoni, and returning with a new name Kaunitera. The purpose of each name Tuiwai and Tura was akin to duties each have on every sea voyage: the Tuiwai stock took the helm, while the Tura stock is to change of the mast that must be transferred to either end of the canoe when necessitated to catch wind. Thus the two bow design of Fijian sailing canoe.

Soon before Colonial era, ensured after the Manukui War, the Navucunimasi (now commonly referred to as Namoala), also known as the Nasau people, on their return from the competition they were sent for, saw a void in the leadership on the island after the passing of Veremi of Wainikelei. The namemoala was theorised upon approach of the clan supposedly Totoya after being blown off-course on his maiden voyage with the word "Mua-la" (follow the bow of the canoe)). The analogy was also use to when the Nasau clan approached the island, after being sent off from Sawakasa, Tailevu at the end of the chiefs game (akin to the Olympics) to bestow the successor of the Ratu, with the words, to paraphrase, "if you wanna live, go back to whence you came". The Nasau clan said to have returned from Verata (the winner of the nukukatudrau race, which they participated representing the eldest of the Ratu of Vereta), on the west of Uciwai (the only undisturbed mount, where the eldest of the Ratu settled and occupy) decided to solidify their claim to chiefdom by bestowing the Tui Nasau, after the Manukui war, in the absence of the Head of Wainikelei, in the VKB Wainikeli (misspelled by the than secretary at the time). Soon after the Colonials stepped into the fold forcing the establishment of the Tui Moala, which the Tui Nasau agreed to appoint and let the Turagalevu clan at the time, and was instructed: "to represent/entertain Government at Naroi, whilst bringing all news and request to the Tui Nasau for deliberation to the "vanua" or other Villages". The bestowment of the Tui Nasau was only made possible by the Wainikelei stock, despite not being remotely related to the Manukui War. Legend has it that to complete the ritual, a basket of soil and a bunch of young coconuts will have to be presented as the symbol of land and people. Since neither in the warring faction have such status, the elders at Wainekeli was approached and agreed in the name of peace to partake in the bestowment ceremony.

The Moalan stock are one of Fiji oldest in the group, whose respect and strength can be adorned by the linkage between the island and a few islands in the Fiji group, including Taveuni, Verata, Bau, Gau, Levuka, Cicia, Vatoa, Ono Kadavu and a few others. For instance the Tuicakau in denoted to be of Moalan stock, who legends have it to be bestowed as Tuicakau by villages upon seeing him on the reef. Lineage also ran from village to village in the Lomaitivi group, to the Takalai Gau.

The occupation of Moala began and followed the said order: 1. Wainikelei Clan, 2. Navucunimasi, a.k.a Nasau Clan, 3. Votua (moved to now Cakova), 5/4. Manukui (moved to now Vunuku), 4/5. Keteicake (returning after occupying Lakeba). 6. Nuku, 7. Maloku, 8. Vadra.

See also
Moala Lailai, whose village include: Keteria (formerly Uciwai) Vunuku, Nasoki and Cakova, with keenly influence from Wainikelei (post-Colonially referred to as Keteira), the first inhabitants of the island via Totoya. See Tawa ni Vanua ko Viti, Rv Epeli Waqatabu.
 List of islands

References
Rev Epeli Waqatabu, a.k.a Ramokanirai

Islands of Fiji
Lau Islands